American Drift is the first studio album by American electronic musician and composer Elysia Crampton, after her previous work under the name E+E. It was released on August 7, 2015, on Blueberry Records and was released to high critical acclaim from various critics.

Background
Crampton began composing American Drift in 2012 while living in Roanoke and Richmond, Virginia, and was further producing the album in La Paz, Bolivia in 2014. The album was created as part of a project to describe the experience of prehistoric and precolonial history in direct relation to African-American history and Aymara history, as well as Christian faith and ontology. Crampton was inspired by Southern hip hop and crunk, Bolivian and Peruvian prog, metal and psych, trival/tribal-guarachero, black spirituals and early blues, psychedelic folk, and neo-classical music, as well as her brother's avant-garde records, and her grandfather's collection of huayno and cumbia tapes. She also cited late writer José Esteban Muñoz's writings on brownness, which she correlated with the Earth and its geology.

In press photos for American Drift, Crampton was often depicted in forest settings, as well as holding a copy of Stacy Alaimo's Bodily Natures: Science, Environment, and the Material Self.

Concept

Crampton described both herself and American Drift as taking a transevangelistic approach. The title track, written for and spoken by her collaborator Money Allah (who also appears on "Wing"), is set as a transevangelistic prayer. Lyrically, it references Paul Claudel's poetic cycle "The Way of the Cross" and the Christian hymn "Rock of Ages", and depicts the "wildly disanthropocentric" transformation of natural settings. "Petrichrist"'s name is a portmanteau of petrichor and Christ, and musically documents Crampton herself driving in her Ford Ranger up the Shenandoah Mountain in Virginia, intended as a depiction of "an encounter between mountain and vehicle, interactions of non-human objects touching one another in a Worlding where all things have agency." "Wing" is a piece in two parts based on particular natural cycles in prehistory; it portrays an impact event, leading into "negative photosynthesis" and finally fern spikes; the track is also dedicated to black pianist Margaret Bonds, whose piano pieces were formulative on the album among Crampton's influences. "Axacan" is named for and musically depicts the Ajacán Mission, where the first Spanish settlement in Virginia occurred violently.

Composition
Alongside the influences laid out in the press release of the album, American Drift uses a distinct keyboard-based rich musical palette, including ambient pads, woodwinds and horns, and Hollywood-style stock sound effects including vocal bites, explosions, alerts, gunshots, beeps and evil laughs. These sounds are often arranged atmospherically or rhythmically in juxtaposition with the otherwise polyphonic and minimalist tone of the music, and in particular, Crampton's style of sound collages with such samples has been dubbed as "epic collage". Crampton's collaborator, Money Allah, who speaks and sings on the title track and "Wing", is described as a "thug dove".

On "Petrichrist" and "Wing", rhythm samples reminiscent of Baile funk are used alongside cumbia patterns, and on "Axacan",  samples are interspersed with rhythms recalling Andean khantus music. The album is punctuated with vocal samples and synths that refer back to Southern rap and crunk, including "yup!"s and, on "Axacan", vocal bites of rapper Lil Jon saying "yeahhh!", "what!" and "okayyy!". In correlation, the second section of "Wing" is described as a 'crunk-huayno ballad'. Guitars, flutes and horns that appear to be played on Kurzweil and Yamaha keyboards appear throughout, as well as similarly electronic-sounding bells, chimes and ambient pads that, according to Nick James Scavo of Tiny Mix Tapes, set an Appalachian scene.

Philip Sherburne, writing for Pitchfork, described American Drift as artistically evoking "a hillside that's been worn away by erosion to reveal a sedimentary record of the millennia". He also commented on the album's use of 'woodblock rhythms', "trap chants" and "coruscating organs", praising them, as elements of the record, as being 'overwhelming in the best way.' Nick James Scavo, writing for Tiny Mix Tapes, commented that 'the beauty of Crampton's art is that it gorgeously describes a drifting, transitional nature — to pin it down is to forget its essence, to rob it of movement.' Scavo also stated that the album artistically "evoke[s] the biologically self-queering nature of the "sublime" [and] approaches the "opening" of Crampton’s sound as a trans-ontology".

Track listing

References

2015 debut albums
Elysia Crampton albums
Concept albums
Folktronica albums
Cumbia albums
Minimal music albums
Experimental music albums
Sound collage albums